The Face of Lincoln is a 1955 short documentary film in which sculptor Robert Merrell Gage models the features of Abraham Lincoln while narrating the story of Lincoln's life. It won an Oscar at the 28th Academy Awards in 1956 for Best Short Subject (Two-Reel) and was also nominated for Documentary Short Subject. The film was directed by Edward Freed and produced by USC School of Cinematic Arts instructor Wilbur T. Blume.

References

External links

Wilber T. Blume
Watch The Face of Lincoln on C-SPAN Video Library

1955 films
1955 documentary films
1955 short films
1950s short documentary films
American black-and-white films
American short documentary films
Black-and-white documentary films
Films about Abraham Lincoln
Documentary films about presidents of the United States
Documentary films about visual artists
Live Action Short Film Academy Award winners
University of Southern California
Films about sculptors
1950s English-language films
1950s American films